Gordon Coulter (5 October 1898 – 14 November 1971) was a former Australian rules footballer who played with Melbourne in the Victorian Football League (VFL).

Coulter was the originator of the 1930 Coulter Law, which prescribed a maximum payer to VFL players, a racehorse owner, a leading Melbourne golfer, a director of Carlton and United Breweries and the City Mutual Life Assurance Society, and was elected to the Melbourne Council in 1951.

Notes

External links 

1898 births
Australian rules footballers from Melbourne
Melbourne Football Club players
1971 deaths
People from Albert Park, Victoria
Politicians from Melbourne